A chat room is part of a website where visitors can converse in typed messages.

Chat room or chatroom may also refer to:

 Chat Room (film), a 2002 American comedy film
 Chat Room (novel), a 2006 novel by Barbara Biggs
 Chat Room (TV program), an American educational television series
 Chatroom (film), a 2010 British thriller drama film